Harmanpreet is a given name. Notable people with the name include:

Harmanpreet Kaur (born 1989), Indian cricketer
Harmanpreet Singh (born 1996), Indian field hockey player
Harmanpreet Singh (footballer) (born 2001), Indian footballer

Indian given names